On 27 November 2017, a Belgian passenger train ran away during recovery operations following a collision at a level crossing. After 14 kilometres (8.7 mi), it collided with a stationary train at Strépy-Bracquegnies, killing two and injuring seven. The accident was caused by a failed coupling.

Accidents

Level crossing
At 07:25 CET (06:25 UTC) on 27 November 2017, a passenger train collided with a car on a level crossing at Morlanwelz, Hainaut, Belgium. A fire broke out, damaging the leading carriage of Class AM96 electric multiple unit 449, which formed the passenger train with unit 442. The driver of the car had managed to escape from the vehicle before it was hit by the train. There were no injuries on the train. The fire was quickly extinguished.

Runaway and collision
During recovery operations at about 20:00, the three carriages of unit 449 were detached from unit 442 train at Piéton. The unit ran away towards La Louvière, subsequently striking four Infrabel employees who were repairing the track at Morlanwelz,  from Piéton. Two were killed and two were seriously injured. An attempt to stop the train by cutting the power supply was unsuccessful. The second train involved was formed of two Class AM96 units, including unit 483. Five people were injured.

Aftermath
That section reopened to traffic on 4 December.

Investigations
A research institution opened an investigation into the accidents. Investigations were also opened by SNCB, Infrabel and the Judiciary. It was originally reported that the coupling failed between units 442 and 449, which caused the runaway.

References

2017 in Belgium
History of Hainaut
November 2017 events in Europe
Railway accidents in 2017
Railway accidents and incidents in Belgium
Runaway train disasters
La Louvière